Hällåsen is a sports venue in Söderhamn, Sweden. It is the home of Broberg/Söderhamn Bandy since 1976.

References

Bandy venues in Sweden
Sport in Söderhamn